Felix Laband is an electronic music artist born in 1977 in Pietermaritzburg, South Africa.

He creates light, emotional, minimalist soundscapes by combining several styles, and samples from classical, jazz and old television recordings overlaid with instrumental performances by himself and other guest artists.  His music has been described by his record label as 'indietronica' and is similar in some ways to Boards of Canada and Iceland's múm.

Discography 

 Thin Shoes in June  (on CD) (2001)
 4/4 Down the Stairs  (on CD) (2002)
 Dark Days Exit  (on CD and LP) (2005)
 Whistling In Tongues (12") (2006)
 Deaf Safari (on CD) (2015)
 The Soft White Hand (2022)

Record labels 
Felix's first two albums were released by African Dope Records. In 2005 he switched to Open Record, and Compost Records internationally with the release of Dark Days Exit.

References

External links 
 Official Artist Page (Open Records)
 Last.FM Artist Page (A social music profiling service)
 Interview from 2002
 Amuzine page

1977 births
Living people
Trip hop musicians
South African dance musicians
South African electronic musicians
Compost Records artists